Chapel Hill – Chauncy Hall School (CH-CH) is an independent,  college-preparatory day and boarding school for grades 8 through PG located on a 42-acre campus in Waltham, Massachusetts and founded in 1828. CH-CH is accredited by the New England Association of Schools and Colleges.

History
Chapel Hill – Chauncy Hall's history involves three schools: Chauncy Hall, Chapel Hill, and the Huntington School. Chapel Hill, a school for girls founded in 1860 in Waltham on the current campus, and Chauncy Hall, a Boston day school for boys founded in 1828, merged in 1971 to create Chapel Hill – Chauncy Hall.

To the merger, Chapel Hill brought its strength in humanities and the arts, and Chauncy Hall brought its strength in the fields of science and math. In 1974, Chapel Hill-Chauncy Hall incorporated the Huntington School, a Boston school for boys founded in 1909.

Chapel Hill – Chauncy Hall has many long-standing traditions. Wilkins Hall and its free-standing spiral staircase is still in use today. At Head of School installations, the book of the school is passed from one head to the next. Charles Henry Sampson scholarships are annually awarded to qualified students. Additionally, the school continues to keep in contact with alumni of Chauncy Hall, Chapel Hill, and the Huntington School.

Student population and diversity
CH-CH has 175 students, with a 45% boarding population and 55% day, and a 25% international student population. The school community celebrates its diversity with Diversity Day that consists of student led workshops that introduce faculty and fellow students to new countries. Additionally, there is an annual Flag Day ceremony in which students have an opportunity to share their heritage with the rest of the school.

Course requirements
Course requirements at CH-CH consist of 4 years of English, 3 years of math (through algebra 2), 3 years of history (including U.S. history), 3 years of laboratory science, 2 sequential years of a foreign language, and 2 years of visual or performing arts. CH-CH also offers honors, advanced, or AP courses in all of the major academic disciplines for students looking to advance their studies.

Students enrolled in a history class are required to write a research paper during the winter trimester and all students enrolled in a science class participate in the annual science fair each May.

Senior Capstone: All seniors complete a composition in English, a research project in either history or science, and give a presentation to the school in order to graduate. Each senior is also required to complete 19 hours of community service.

Multiple Intelligences Approach

Classes are influenced by Dr. Howard Gardner of Harvard University, who developed the Theory of Multiple Intelligences. Dr. Gardner proposes that there are nine "intelligences" that schools need to support: interpersonal, intrapersonal, existential, mathematical/logical, kinesthetic, linguistic, naturalist, musical, and spatial. Teachers incorporate these intelligences into their curriculum.

On October 17, 2013 Howard Gardner visited the CH-CH campus. According to Dr. Gardner, "when something is important, try to teach it lots of different ways... Textbooks are fine, but not everybody learns best from text books. iPads, hands-on, works of art, debate, humor, graphics, and video, the more different ways you can teach something, the more likely it is to get in there, stay in there, and be useful."

Progress notes
Each week, teachers write progress notes for each of their students as a way to inform students and their families on how they are doing in each of their classes and what they could be doing to improve. Teachers may also include the most recent grades that students have received on assignments or tests. Progress notes can be accessed online by both students and parents through the myCH-CH portal.

Schedule and school year calendar
Students follow a schedule in which full credit courses meet for 75 minutes three times per week. During a typical week, students have four classes per day on Monday, Tuesday, and Thursday and three classes on Wednesday and Friday. The academic year is divided into trimesters ending in November, March, and May/June. Students grade point averages (GPA) are recalculated at the end of each trimester. Graduation ceremonies are held during the last week of May or the first week of June.

Main campus facilities
Harrington Hall: Named in honor of Louisa C. Harrington 2011. Today it consists of the dining hall and Clemence room downstairs and the freshmen and sophomore girls’ dormitory upstairs.

Cottage: The 9th grade building where almost all freshmen classes are held.

The CH-CH Commons: After serving the Waltham community for 150 years, the Covenant Congregational Church closed in 2010. In late 2011, the space was purchased by Chapel Hill-Chauncy Hall and connected with the rest of the campus. Each section was renovated and repurposed before reopening in 2012 as The CH-CH Commons. Performing arts, foreign language classes, and all school assemblies continue to be held here today. The CH-CH Commons is also home to the school's library and ‘MakerSpace.’ The CH-CH MakerSpace is a place for students to experiment, create, and explore hands-on alternatives to traditional classroom learning, using new technology like 3D modeling and printing, as well as established methods like sewing and basic woodworking. Students in the co-curricular MakerSpace activity investigate varied, self-directed topics, like basic coding, robotics, and prototyping, while academic classes are supported and enhanced by MakerSpace activities that introduce ‘design thinking’—iterative, progressive exploration of course material that encourages experimentation, collaboration, and a focus on process instead of results.

Wilkins Hall: Built in 1864, Wilkins remains the main academic building for upperclassmen history, English, history, science, and math classes.

Worcester Hall: Originally built in 1963 as a girls' dormitory, Worcester Hall is now the boys' dormitory and includes a wrestling facility.

South Hall: A gift from Arthur Astor Carey of the Astor family in 1903, South Hall is now the upperclassmen girls' dormitory.

Peebles Hall: The admissions office

Beaver Gymnasium & Machen Center: Built in 1981 in honor of Claude F. Machen '27. Today it houses the gym, workout room, and nurse's office.

Barn & Theater: Houses arts spaces including the theater, digital arts lab, makerspace studio, photography dark room, pottery studio, and dance/yoga studio. On Wednesday, August 29, Chapel Hill – Chauncy Hall School broke ground on their $5.5 million for their historic building, the visual and performing arts, the Barn renovation. The School added , including a new theater, new music classroom space, expanded state-of-the-art studio spaces, and a glass atrium gallery, creating a  center for the arts. The Barn was renovated in the fall of 2019.

Co-curricular activities
Students are required to participate in the afternoon co-curricular program each trimester. Two activities each year must be interscholastic sports or team activities. A list of offerings are listed below:

Sports:
 Basketball (B/G)
 Cross country (G/B)
 Boys' Baseball
 Tennis (G/B)
 Lacrosse (B/G)
 Soccer (B/G)
 Girls’ Softball
 Ultimate Frisbee
 Girls’ Volleyball
 Wrestling

Other Activities:
 Drama
 Drama Tech
 Podcast 
 Fitness
 Rock Climbing
 Makerspace Studio
 Sports media intern

CH-CH participates in the Massachusetts Bay Independent League (MBIL) for boys’ soccer, cross country, basketball, baseball, and lacrosse. The school is also a member of the Independent Girls’ Conference (IGC) for soccer, basketball, softball and lacrosse and the Eastern Independent League (EIL) for boys’ wrestling.

Recent athletics highlights:

2022: Boys Lacrosse - Massachusetts Bay Independent League Championship

2022: Volleyball - Independent Girls Conference Championship

2020: Boys Basketball - Massachusetts Bay Independent League Championship

2020: Girls Basketball - Independent Girls Conference DII Championship

2019: Softball - Independent Girls Conference Championship (undefeated season 12-0)

2019: Wrestling - Eastern Independent League Championship

2019: Girls Basketball - Independent Girls Conference DII Championship

2019: Wrestling - Eastern Independent League Tournament Champion

2018: Boys Basketball - Massachusetts Bay Independent League Championship

2018: Softball - Independent Girls Conference Championship

2018: Boys Cross Country - Massachusetts Bay Independent League Championship

2018: Volleyball - Independent Girls Conference Championship

2018: Wrestling - Eastern Independent League Tournament Champion

2018: Boys Lacrosse - Massachusetts Bay Independent League Co-Championship

2017: Volleyball - Independent Girls Conference Championship

November 2017: The CHCH girl's varsity volleyball team won the Independent Girl's Conference (IGC) Championship.

November 2017: The CH-CH Cross Country Team won its first Cross Country Massachusetts Bay Independent League (MBIL) Championship in the school's history.

February 2015: Two CH-CH wrestlers represented the school at the National Prep Wrestling Tournament. CH-CH was the strongest finisher from the Eastern Independent League and finished 6th out of all New England schools.

May 2015: The girls' softball team won the Independent Girls’ Conference (IGC) Co-Championship—the first IGC Championship in the school's history.

2012: Luke DiOrio '10 debuted his professional career as a member of the Rhode Island Rampage, a team in the American Ultimate Disc League (AUDL).

Spring Session program
In the spring of 2013, CH-CH began an experimental learning program called Spring Session. The program takes place during the last week of May and consists of a variety of experiences that give students the opportunity to engage themselves in a topic they are passionate about. A few past Spring Session experiences have included:

 Walt Disney World educational programs
 Circus Arts at Esh Aerial Arts Studio
 Creative Writing Workshop
 A trip to Washington D.C. and Gettysburg to study the Civil War.
 Studying Marine Biology in Key West

Earlier in the school year, students are given the option to choose from over a dozen potential experiences. Each experience is designed and chaperoned by CH-CH faculty and staff. All of the offerings have an educational component. Upon their return, each group gives a presentation to the school on their Spring Session experience.

Recent graduation speakers
 June 7, 2003: The Reverend Zina Jacque, Director of Pastoral Counseling, Trinity Church
 June 3, 2006: Andre Dubus III, Author, Executive board member, PEN New England
 May 31: 2008: Rev. Dr. Bruce H. Wall, senior pastor, global ministries Christian church
 May 30, 2009: Daniel Strachman, author
 June 5, 2010: Michael G. Thompson, psychologist, author
 June 4, 2011: Eric Giler, CEO, WiTricity
 June 2, 2012: Prince Faisal bin Hussein, Hashemite Kingdom of Jordan
 June 1, 2013: Gregory Mankiw, author, Professor at Harvard University
 May 31, 2014: Dr. Siri Akal Khalsa, Former CH-CH President
 May 30, 2015: Jim Nwobodo, Senator of Nigeria
 June 4, 2016: David Rosenthal, MD, senior physician, Dana-Farber Cancer Institute
 June 3, 2017: Richard Weissbourd, Ed.D., faculty member, Harvard's Graduate School of Education
 June 2, 2018: Tracee Chimo, actress
 June 4, 2022: Seth Moulton, United States Congressperson

Notable alumni
 Alice Stone Blackwell
 Ida Smoot Dusenberry
 Curtis Guild Jr., Guild was educated at Chauncy Hall and then attended Harvard University. At both schools he was involved in military organizations and he became a lieutenant in Harvard's rifle corps in 1879. In 1906, he became the 43rd Governor of Massachusetts serving until 1909.
 C. M. S. McLellan
 Benjamin F. Nutting
 James Sturgis Pray
 Edward Everett Rose
 Marion Talbot
 Abbott Handerson Thayer
 Lucy Wheelock, enrolled in the Chauncy Hall School to prepare for college in 1876, but her discovery of the school's kindergarten altered her plans. After graduating, she became a kindergarten teacher at Chauncy Hall. In 1888, Wheelock instituted a one-year training course for teachers of the school. By 1896, Wheelock left the school to form the independent Wheelock Kindergarten Training School. Several decades later, Wheelock College was named to honor her efforts in the field of education.

Camps
Chapel Hill – Chauncy Hall School is the host of Running Brook Day Camp for youth and teens between the ages of 3.5–18.

References

External links
Chapel Hill – Chauncy Hall website

Private high schools in Massachusetts
Buildings and structures in Waltham, Massachusetts
Educational institutions established in 1828
Schools in Middlesex County, Massachusetts
Boarding schools in Massachusetts